Cladonia homosekikaica is a species of cup lichen belonging to the family Cladoniaceae. It was formally described as a new species by Japanese lichenologist Mariko Nuno in 1975.

As of July 2021, its conservation status has not been estimated by the IUCN. In Iceland, its conservations status is data deficient (DD).

See also
List of Cladonia species

References

homosekikaica
Lichen species
Lichens described in 1975
Lichens of Asia